The 2012–13 Russian Premier League was the 21st season of the Russian football championship since the dissolution of the Soviet Union and 11th under the current Russian Premier League name. It began on 21 July 2012 and ended on 26 May 2013, with a winter break between the weekends around 13 December 2012 and 10 March 2013.

16 teams from 12 cities compete in the season, with Zenit St. Petersburg as defending champions. For the first time since 2005, no Siberian clubs take part.

This was the first season in Russian football history to be played on the basis of the autumn/spring calendar, rather than the spring/autumn schedule traditionally used in Russia due to climate conditions.

A total of sixteen teams participate in the league, the best fourteen sides of the 2011–12 season and two promoted clubs from the 2011–12 National Football League.

Teams

The following teams are mathematically confirmed to compete in the 2012–13 season:

Alania Vladikavkaz (promoted from the National League)
Amkar Perm
Anzhi Makhachkala
CSKA Moscow
Dynamo Moscow
FC Krasnodar
Krylia Sovetov Samara
Kuban Krasnodar
Lokomotiv Moscow
Mordovia Saransk (promoted from the National League)
FC Rostov
Rubin Kazan
Spartak Moscow
Terek Grozny
Volga Nizhny Novgorod
Zenit St. Petersburg

Tom Tomsk and Spartak Nalchik were relegated at the end of the 2011–12 season after finishing the season in the bottom two places. Both teams returned to the First Division after respectively seven and six seasons in top level.

The relegated teams were replaced by 2011–12 First Division champions Mordovia Saransk and runners-up Alania Vladikavkaz. Former Russian champions Alania made their immediate return to the Premier League, while Mordovia are playing their first season at the highest football level of Russia.

Personnel and sponsorship

 On the back of number.

Managerial changes

Last updated: 26 May 2013

Tournament format and regulations

Basics 

The 16 teams played a round-robin tournament whereby each team plays each one of the other teams twice, once at home and once away. Thus, a total of 240 matches was played, with 30 matches played by each team.

Promotion and relegation 

The teams that finish 15th and 16th will be relegated to the FNL, while the top two FNL teams will be promoted to the Premier League for the 2013/14 season.

The 13th and 14th Premier League teams will play the 4th and 3rd FNL teams respectively in two playoff games with the winner securing a Premier League spot for 2013/14 (see paragraph 4.5.1 in the league regulations).

Junior teams 

According to long-standing practice, a tournament of junior teams will be held in parallel with the championship. The age limit for junior teams' players for this season is yet to be decided. Each club will be allowed to field no more than 3 field players and 1 goalkeeper older than the age limit.

Foreign players 

As of 4 July, a team will be allowed to have 7 foreign (non-Russian nationals) players on the pitch at the same time, unlike the previous season when the limit was 6 foreigners per team. The new rule will run until 2017.

Season events

Dynamo – Zenit game 

On 17 November 2012, the game in which Dynamo Moscow was hosting Zenit St. Petersburg at Arena Khimki was abandoned at the 37th minute with Dynamo leading 1–0 through a free kick goal by Vladimir Granat when a firecracker thrown from the stands hit Dynamo goalkeeper Anton Shunin. Shunin was taken to the hospital where he was diagnosed with the chemical burns of his corneas and eyelids, conjunctivitis, and otitis of his right ear with partial loss of hearing. Dynamo insisted that the game should be awarded to them. Zenit's general director Mikhail Mitrofanov suggested that Zenit might drop out of the Russian league altogether if the game is awarded to Dynamo. According to the police, the main suspect is a female fan who was arrested after the game. The criminal investigation was opened on the charge of hooliganism. On 22 November, Russian Football Union's Control-Disciplinary Committee awarded the game to Dynamo with a score of 3–0 and fined both clubs.  Dynamo had to play their next home game (against Rubin Kazan) behind closed doors and Zenit had to play their next 2 home games (against CSKA Moscow and Anzhi Makhachkala) behind closed doors as well. Yellow cards received by Bruno Alves and Roman Shirokov before the game was abandoned still count for disciplinary purposes. Shunin did not play in the remaining 3 games of 2012. Zenit only gained 2 points in their behind closed doors games, Dynamo won their behind closed doors game. Zenit filed an appeal for that decision with the Court of Arbitration for Sport, which heard their case on 9 May 2013. The appeal was denied on 14 May 2013.

League table

Results

Statistics

Top goalscorers

Hat-tricks

Relegation play-offs

First leg

Second leg

Awards

Monthly awards

Top 33
On 11 June 2013 Russian Football Union named its list of 33 top players:

Annual awards

Russian Manager of the Season
CSKA Moscow manager Leonid Slutsky, received the Russian Manager of the Season.

Russian Player of the Season
The Russian Player of the Season was awarded to Igor Akinfeev.

Russian Referee of the Season
The Russian Referee of the Season was awarded to Aleksandr Egorov.

Attendances

Top 15 attendances (single match)

Source:

Russian Premier League attendances (average)

Source:

Last updated: 26 May 2013

Medal squads
(league appearances and goals listed in brackets)

References 

2012–13 Russian Premier League Table (Indonesia language)

External links

2012–13 Russian Premier League at Soccerway

2012
1
Russia